
Eutychus  was a young man (or a youth) of Troas tended to by St. Paul. Eutychus fell asleep due to the long nature of the discourse Paul was giving, fell from a window out of the three-story building, and died. Paul then embraced him, insisting that he was not dead, and they carried him back upstairs alive; those gathered then had a meal and a long talk which lasted until dawn. This is related in the New Testament book of the Acts of the Apostles 20:7–12.

Though some (e.g. However, Eutychus' complete recovery from a three-story fall, regardless of the initial result, and Paul's attendance at the scene of the accident, appears to be the impact of the narrative.

The name Eutychus means "fortunate".

The story of Eutychus may be related to the story of Elpenor in the Odyssey.

References

Further reading
Barclay, William (1955), The Acts of the Apostles (Philadelphia: Westminster Press).
Bock, Darrell L. (2007), "Acts: Baker Exegetical Commentary on the New Testament" (Ada, Michigan: Baker Publishing Group)
Bruce, F.F. (1977), Paul: Apostle of the Heart Set Free (Grand Rapids: Eerdmans).
Oster, Richard (1979), The Acts of the Apostles, Part II (Austin, Texas: Sweet Publishing Company).

External links
The Case of Eutychus, Christian Courier

Accidental deaths from falls
People in Acts of the Apostles
Resurrection